Marianne Müller, née Hellmuth (1 or 4 January 1772 – 31 May 1851) was a German soprano and actress.

Life 
Born in Mainz, Müller was the daughter of a singer and voice teacher Franziska Hellmuth and Mainz court musician, Johann Friedrich Hellmuth. She began performing at a very young age. She made her debut singing the part of Gretchen in Anton Schweitzer's Dorfgalle in Bonn in 1780, and appeared as Victorine in Eifersucht auf der Probe in Schwedt in 1785, and as Röschen in Zauberspiegel in Berlin in 1788.

In 1787, she was engaged at the Schweriner Hoftheater and later, from 1788 to 1789, she became a member of the Königliches Theater in Berlin.

Initially, she was employed as an actress, however, over the time, her career slowly moved towards opera. In 1803, she made her debut as Konstanze in Mozart's Die Entführung aus dem Serail. In 1804, she sang the role of Donna Elvira in Don Giovanni, and from 1809 onwards performed Donna Anna. She played the role of Agnes Sorel in Friedrich Schiller's Die Jungfrau von Orleans over 25 times.

On 12 May 1794, she appeared in the Berlin first performance of Mozart’s Die Zauberflöte as The Queen of the Night. In 1815 she became ill and retired in 1816. In 1844 she took part in the 50th anniversary of Die Zauberflöte after the Berlin premiere.

Family
In 1792 she married Müller, a Prussian officer, and began to use the name since 6 May 1794. After her retirement, she lived in Ruppin with her daughter, a pianist and student of Friedrich Wilkes. Later she moved to Berlin and lived there until she died in 1851.

Her sister Katharine Hellmuth (before 1770 – after 1800) was also an actress and singer.

Repertoire 
Below is a list of some of her debut performances.

References

Further reading 
 Ludwig Eisenberg: Großes biographisches Lexikon der Deutschen Bühne im XIX. Jahrhundert. Verlag von Paul List, Leipzig 1903, pg. 702 archive.org – Last accessed 16 December 2016 (in German)

External links 
 Short biography – Bayerischen Musiker-Lexikon Online (in German)
 Biography – Carl-Maria-von-Weber-Gesamtausgabe website (in German)
 Performance profile – Operissimo.com (in German)

1772 births
1851 deaths
German operatic sopranos
Musicians from Mainz
18th-century German women opera singers
18th-century German actresses
19th-century German women opera singers
19th-century German actresses
German stage actresses
Actors from Mainz